Gavin Wolpert (born 1984 in Toronto, Ontario) is a Canadian-American professional bridge player.

Personal life
Garvin Wolpert was born in Toronto, Ontario to a bridge playing family. His mother Hazel, a bridge teacher, started to teach him bridge at the age of seven. Later he trained with the Canadian junior bridge team, and subsequently moved to Florida.

He is married to Jenny Wolpert, formerly Jenny Ryman of Sweden, another professional player. They have three children.

Bridge accomplishments

Awards

 ACBL King or Queen of Bridge (1) 2000

Wins

 North American Bridge Championships (7)
 Silodor Open Pairs (1) 2011 
 Blue Ribbon Pairs (1) 2005 
 North American Pairs (1) 2013 
 Roth Open Swiss Teams (1) 2014 
 Keohane North American Swiss Teams (1) 2004 
 Chicago Mixed Board-a-Match (1) 2009 
 Roth Open Swiss Teams (1) 2009

Runners-up

 North American Bridge Championships
 Keohane North American Swiss Teams (1) 2012 
 Spingold (1) 2004

References

External links
  
 Bridge Kids: Gavin Wolpert, Canadian star, talks about junior bridge audio-video conversation at YouTube (uploaded August 5, 2010)

1984 births
Canadian contract bridge players
American contract bridge players
Living people
Sportspeople from Toronto